Stéphane Pedrazzi is a French journalist, currently serving as an anchorman on BFM Business and BFM TV. Previously, he worked for CNBC as the channel's Paris correspondent until December 2015. He was appointed to the post in January 2007 in the run-up to the French presidential election.

Prior to joining CNBC, Pedrazzi worked at the French language edition of Bloomberg Television, serving as writer/anchor of the daily morning programme "Matin Bourse" between 2004 and 2007. Pedrazzi had previously presented other Bloomberg programs as well as reporting for the channel.

Pedrazzi has also worked for French station Radio Classique as London correspondent, as well as for Télé Lyon Métropole. He started his journalistic career in 1992 as a presenter on Lyon's Classic FM.

References

External links
Stéphane Pedrazzi bio at CNBC.com

1973 births
Living people
People from Bourgoin-Jallieu
French people of Italian descent
French television journalists